Pietrăria transmitter is a 180-metre guyed mast for FM and TV broadcasting at Pietrăria, a village near Iaşi, Romania. It has a square cross section and is much thicker than most guyed masts of similar height.

The dendrological park of Repedea is in the transmitter's vicinity.

See also
 List of tallest structures in Romania
 Seven hills of Iaşi

References
 Predavatel.ro

Towers in Romania
Transmitter sites in Romania